The 2014 Haarlem Baseball Week was an international baseball competition held at the Pim Mulier Stadium in Haarlem, the Netherlands from July 11–20, 2014. It was the 27th edition of the tournament.

In the final the United States won over Japan, becoming champions for the fifth time as the national team.

Teams
Due to difficult economic times, the organisation had to decide not to invite reigning champions Cuba. This was announced after the first four teams (Chinese Taipei, Japan, Netherlands, United States) had already signed their contracts. Other teams had also canceled their participation for various reasons, including the inability to send an up-to-par team. As a result, only four teams competed in this tournament instead of the usual six.

 
 Chinese Taipei is the official IBAF designation for the team representing the state officially referred to as the Republic of China, more commonly known as Taiwan. (See also political status of Taiwan for details.)

Group stage

Standings

Game results

Final round

Semi finals

Final

Final standings

External links
Official Website

References

Haarlem Baseball Week